The Battle of Montgisard was fought between the Kingdom of Jerusalem and the Ayyubids on 25 November 1177 at Montgisard, in the Levant between Ramla and Yibna. The 16-year-old Baldwin IV of Jerusalem, seriously afflicted by leprosy, led an outnumbered Christian force against Saladin's troops in what became one of the most notable engagements of the Crusades. The Muslim army was quickly routed and pursued for twelve miles. Saladin fled back to Cairo, reaching the city on 8 December, with only a tenth of his army. Muslim historians considered Saladin's defeat to be so severe that it was only redeemed by his victory ten years later at the Battle of Hattin in 1187, although Saladin defeated Baldwin in the Battle of Marj Ayyun in 1179, only to be defeated by Baldwin again at the Battle of Belvoir Castle in 1182.

Background
In 1177, Baldwin IV, and Philip of Alsace who had recently arrived on pilgrimage, planned an alliance with the Byzantine Empire for a naval attack on Egypt; but none of these plans came to fruition. Instead, Philip decided to join Raymond of Tripoli's expedition to attack the Saracen stronghold of Hama in northern Syria. A large crusader army, the Knights Hospitaller and many Templar knights followed him. This left the Kingdom of Jerusalem with very few troops to defend its various territories. Meanwhile, Saladin was planning his own invasion of the Kingdom of Jerusalem from Egypt. When he was informed of the expedition north, he wasted no time in organising a raid and invaded the kingdom with an army of some 30,000 men. Learning of Saladin's plans, Baldwin IV left Jerusalem with, according to William of Tyre, only 375 knights to attempt a defense at Ascalon, but Baldwin was stalled there by a detachment of troops sent by Saladin. Saladin left part of his army to besiege Gaza and a smaller force at Ascalon and marched northward with the rest.

Opposing forces
The true numbers are impossible to estimate, since the Christian sources refer only to knights and give no account of the number of infantry and turcopoles, except that it is evident from the number of the dead and wounded that there must have been more men than the 375 knights. It is also uncertain whether the so-called knights included mounted sergeants or squires, or whether they were true knights. One contemporary chronicler gave a strength of 7,000 for the Latin army, while another contemporary estimate of 20,000 was probably a textual corruption of 10,000. However, modern historians generally deem the number of Frankish troops to have been lower; 375 knights and 80 Templars for less than 500 armored heavy cavalry, as well as 2,500 to 4,000 infantry and archers (spearmean, swordsmen, axemen, crossbowmen and turcopoles), could explain why Saladin did not remotely believe such a tiny force of Christians should be considered a threat and marched at his leisure on Jerusalem, allowing his army to spread out across the countryside to pillage the Kingdom’s farmlands.

Just as uncertain are the numbers of their opponents. An 1181 review listed Saladin's Mamluk forces at 6,976 Ghulams and 1,553 Qaraghulams. However, there would have been additional soldiers available in Syria and elsewhere, while auxiliaries might have accompanied the Mamluks. William of Tyre reported Saladin's strength as 26,000, while an anonymous chronicler estimated 12,000 Turkish and 9,000 Arab troops, which Stevenson calls "greatly exaggerated". Accompanying Baldwin was Raynald de Châtillon, Lord of Oultrejordain, who had just been released from captivity in Aleppo in 1176. Raynald was a fierce enemy of Saladin and was King Baldwin's second-in-command. Also with the army were Baldwin of Ibelin, his brother Balian, Reginald Grenier and Joscelin III of Edessa. Eudes de Saint-Amand, Grand Master of the Knights Templar, came with 80 Templar knights. Another Templar force attempted to meet Baldwin at Ascalon, but they remained besieged at Gaza.

The battle
Saladin continued his march towards Jerusalem, thinking that Baldwin would not dare to follow him with so few men. He attacked Ramla, Lydda and Arsuf, but because Baldwin was supposedly not a danger, he allowed his army to be spread out over a large area, pillaging and foraging. However, unknown to Saladin, the forces he had left to subdue the King had been insufficient and now both Baldwin and the Templars were marching to intercept him before he reached Jerusalem.

The Christians, led by the King, pursued the Muslims along the coast, finally catching their enemies at Mons Gisardi, near Ramla. The location is disputed, as Ramla was a large region that included the town under the same name. Malcolm Barber equates Mons Gisardi with the mound of al-Safiya. Saladin's chronicler Imad ad-Din al-Isfahani refers to the battle taking place by the mound of Al-Safiya, potentially modern Tell es-Safi near the village of Menehem, not far from Ashkelon, and within the contemporary Ramla province. Al-Safiya means white and, indeed, the Es-Safi hill is white with the foundations of a Crusader castle recently found at the top, called Blanchegarde. Ibn Al-Athīr, one of the Arab chroniclers, mentions that Saladin intended to lay siege to a Crusader castle in the area. But Saladin's baggage train had been apparently mired. There is a small stream north of Tell es-Safi bordering farmland that in November might have been plowed up and muddy enough to hinder the passage of the baggage train. The Egyptian chroniclers agree that the baggage had been delayed at a river crossing. Saladin was taken totally by surprise. His army was in disarray: part had been held up by the mired baggage train while another part of his force had scattered into raiding parties across the countryside. The horses were tired from the long march. Some men had to hurry to collect their weapons from the baggage train. Saladin's army, in a state of panic, scrambled to make battle lines against the enemy. King Baldwin ordered the relic of the True Cross to be raised in front of the troops. The King, whose teenage body was already ravaged by aggressive leprosy, was helped from his horse and dropped to his knees before the cross. He prayed to God for victory and rose to his feet to cheers from his men, who were moved by what they had just witnessed.

The Jerusalem army attacked the hurriedly arranged Muslims, inflicting heavy casualties. The King, fighting with bandaged hands to cover his sores, was in the thick of the fighting. Egyptian effective command was under Saladin's nephew Taqi ad-Din. Taqi ad-Din apparently attacked while Saladin was putting his Mamluk guard together. Taqi’s son Ahmad died in the early fighting. Saladin's men were quickly overwhelmed. Saladin himself only avoided capture by escaping, as Ralph de Diceto claims, on a racing camel. By nightfall, those Egyptians that were with the Sultan had reached Caunetum Esturnellorum near the mound of Tell el-Hesi. This is about 25 miles from Ramla. It is only about 7 km from Tell es-Safi (al-Safiya).

Baldwin pursued Saladin until nightfall, and then retired to Ascalon. Only a remnant of his army made it back to Egypt with him.

Aftermath
Baldwin memorialized his victory by erecting a Benedictine monastery on the battlefield, dedicated to St. Catherine of Alexandria, whose feast day fell on the day of the battle. However, it was a difficult victory; Roger de Moulins, Grand Master of the Knights Hospitaller, reported that  men had been killed and 750 returned home wounded.

Meanwhile, Raymond III of Tripoli and Bohemund III of Antioch joined with Philip of Alsace in a separate expedition against Harim in Syria; the siege of Harim lasted into 1178, and Saladin's defeat at Montgisard prevented him from relieving his Syrian vassals.

Related campaigns 
 1179: Battle of Marj Ayyun
 1179: Battle of Jacob's Ford
 1182: Battle of Belvoir Castle
 1183: Battle of Al-Fule
 1187: Battle of Cresson
 1187: Battle of Hattin
 1187: Siege of Tyre

Fiction
The battle of Montgisard is alluded to in the 2005 movie Kingdom of Heaven, as a battle where King Baldwin IV defeated Saladin when he was sixteen. It was also described in the novel Jerusalem, written by Cecelia Holland.

An account of the battle is also given in Swedish author Jan Guillou's novel Tempelriddaren (The Knight Templar), in which the protagonist, Arn Magnusson (de Gothia) is portrayed as a high-ranking member of the Knights Templar, commanding a contingent of the army at the battle of Montgisard. The battle is shown in the movie Arn – The Knight Templar, which was based on Guillou's book.

Notes

References

Bibliography

Further reading
Baha ad-Din ibn Shaddad, The Rare and Excellent History of Saladin, ed. D. S. Richards, Ashgate, 2002.
Willemi Tyrensis Archiepiscopi Chronicon, ed. R. B. C. Huygens. Turnholt, 1986.
Bernard Hamilton, The Leper King and his Heirs, Cambridge University Press, 2000.

R. C. Smail, Crusading Warfare, 1097–1193. Cambridge University Press, 1956.

Battles involving the Ayyubids
Battles involving the Kingdom of Jerusalem
Conflicts in 1177
1177 in Asia
Battles involving the Knights Templar
Battles of Saladin
1170s in the Kingdom of Jerusalem
1170s in the Ayyubid Sultanate